Shadow Keep is a role-playing video game created in 1991 by Glenn Seemann. The black and white Macintosh game takes place in a fictional kingdom with the player beginning just outside the castle. The plot of the game involves recovering the Ankh stolen from the Temple of Life by the Evil One. 

The main quest involves traveling to the Far Land through the Labyrinth to get the Black Sword to defeat the Evil One, though there are numerous side quests to obtain items that are instrumental in accomplishing this. The gameplay is non linear, with the player left to explore the large world. Unlike many modern games, it is possible to kill characters who are needed to advance the plotline. Any creature encountered in the game may be spoken to, though conversation attempts with hostile characters will be ignored.

See also
Shadowkeep, an earlier text adventure and role-playing game, released in 1984 by Telarium Corporation and co-written by Alan Dean Foster.

References

1991 video games
Classic Mac OS-only games
Classic Mac OS games
Role-playing video games
Video games developed in the United States
Video games set in castles